German submarine U-220 was a Type XB submarine of Nazi Germany's Kriegsmarine during World War II.

The U-boat was laid down on 16 June 1941 at the Germaniawerft yard at Kiel as yard number 626, launched on 16 January 1943 and commissioned on 27 March 1943 under the command of Oberleutnant zur See Bruno Barber.

The boat's service career began with training in the 4th U-boat Flotilla followed by reassignment to the 12th flotilla for operations.

In one patrol, the submarine sank two ships.

The boat was sunk on 28 October 1943 by US aircraft in mid-Atlantic.

Service history

Patrol and loss
Following a short journey from Kiel to Bergen in Norway, the submarine set out on patrol on 8 September 1943 through the gap between Iceland and the Faroe Islands, heading for the North American coast. Off St. Johns in Canada, she laid 66 magnetic mines on 9 October, one of which sank Delisle on the 19th. Also lost on the same day was Penolver. The master of Delisle was trapped on the sinking ship by his wooden leg. He was freed, rescued and taken to a hospital, minus his leg. He could not be released due to the wartime shortage of artificial limbs, but his original leg was found, washed up on a beach and recovered.

In between these events, two men were lost overboard on the 16th.

U-220 was sunk by depth charges dropped by Avenger and Wildcat aircraft from the carrier  on 28 October 1943. Fifty-six men died; there were no survivors.

Summary of raiding history

References

Bibliography

External links

1943 ships
German Type X submarines
Minelayers
Ships built in Kiel
U-boats commissioned in 1943
U-boats sunk by US aircraft
World War II submarines of Germany
U-boats sunk in 1943
U-boats sunk by depth charges
Ships lost with all hands
Maritime incidents in October 1943